Yixing railway station is a railway station in Yixing, Wuxi, Jiangsu, China. It is an intermediate stop on the Nanjing–Hangzhou high-speed railway. It opened with the line on 1 July 2013.

References 

Railway stations in Jiangsu
Railway stations in China opened in 2013